"Yes Sir" is a song by American hip hop duo Capone-N-Noreaga. It was released in 2003 as the first single from their album The New Religion, which was eventually shelved by their label, Def Jam Recordings. The song was later included on their mixtape What Up 2 da Hood. "Yes Sir" also appeared on the soundtrack in the video game, Def Jam Fight for NY. The song features Musaliny-N-Maze.

Music video
The music video was filmed in downtown New York. It begins with the scene of a traffic jam. Then a big mob of gangsters emerges from the bus and crashes a party. CNN, Musaliny and Maze are rapping their verses. At the end the police arrive and arrest all of them.

References

2003 singles
Def Jam Recordings singles
2003 songs
Song recordings produced by Midi Mafia
Capone-N-Noreaga songs
Songs written by N.O.R.E.